William James Hines (28 April 1880 – 17 December 1959) was an  Australian rules footballer who played with Geelong in the Victorian Football League (VFL).

Notes

External links 

1880 births
1959 deaths
Australian rules footballers from Victoria (Australia)
Geelong Football Club players